Austin Cameron (born January 24, 1977) is an American stock car racing driver. He competes mainly in the NASCAR K&N Pro Series West, formerly the Winston West Series, twice finishing second in series points.

Racing career
Born in El Cajon, California, Cameron began racing go-karts at the age of 9. He competed in various types of go-karts before eventually graduating to stockcars. He won the Rookie of the Year award in 1996 in the late model division at Willow Springs Raceway in Rosamond, California. Despite not attending the first NASCAR Winston West Series race of the season in 1998, Cameron went on to win the Rookie-of-the-Year Award and finished fourth in the championship standings. He was among a contingent of NWWS drivers to participate in the NASCAR exhibition event in Japan at Twin Ring Motegi in November 1998. He collected his first series win in 1999 at Irwindale Speedway and finished the year second in the championship standings.

He made his Sprint Cup debut at Infineon Raceway in 2002, he finished 42nd due to a clutch failure on lap 24. He made his next start two years later at Infineon in 2004, finishing in 38th 32 laps down.

In 2003, Cameron was diagnosed with Non-Hodgkin lymphoma; after three years of treatment that included open heart surgery, he returned to racing.

Personal life
Cameron holds a business degree from the University of California, Santa Barbara, and acts as president of TC Construction, founded by his father. He is married, to Rachelle, and the couple have two children.

Motorsports career results

NASCAR
(key) (Bold - Pole position awarded by qualifying time. Italics - Pole position earned by points standings or practice time. * – Most laps led. ** – All laps led.)

Nextel Cup Series

Busch Series

Craftsman Truck Series

K&N Pro Series West

ARCA Re/Max Series
(key) (Bold – Pole position awarded by qualifying time. Italics – Pole position earned by points standings or practice time. * – Most laps led.)

References

External links

Living people
1977 births
Sportspeople from El Cajon, California
Racing drivers from California
NASCAR drivers
University of California, Santa Barbara alumni
Barber Pro Series drivers
U.S. F2000 National Championship drivers
International Kart Federation drivers
ARCA Menards Series drivers